This list of islands of the Piteå archipelago includes the many islands, large and small, in the Swedish Piteå archipelago in the north of the Bothnian Bay.
They are part of the larger archipelago that encompasses islands around the northern end of the bay.

Islands in Piteå Municipality include:

 Baggen 
 Baljan 
 Bergön 
 Bergskäret 
 Bergvättingen 
 Berkön 
 Bondökallarna 
 Bondökallrevet 
 Bondön 
 Bursfjärdgrundet 
 Degerbergsgrundet 
 Djupgrunden 
 Döman 
 Fårön, Piteå 
 Fårön, Trundön 
 Fjärdvättingen 
 Fjuksören 
 Fjuksörrevet 
 Flottgrunden 
 Fördärvet 
 Furuholmen 
 Görjeskäret 
 Gråsjähällan 
 Gråsjälen 
 Gråsjälgrundet 
 Grundkallen 
 Grytan 
 Guldsmeden 
 Hällen 
 Hällskäret 
 Hällskärsgrundet 
 Halsören 
 Hamngrunden 
 Hamnholmen 
 Hamnviksgrundet 
 Hans-Persagrundet 
 Haraholmsrevet 
 Huvan 
 Innersten Bondökallen 
 Innerstholmen-Bastaholmen 
 Inre Mjoögrunden 
 Inre Mörögrundet 
 Jävre Sandön 
 Jävreholmen 
 Klacken 
 Klemmeten 
 Klemmetgrundet 
 Klingergrundet 
 Klingergrundsrevet 
 Klinten 
 Kluntarna 
 Kluntbrotten 
 Krokamargit 
 Lakakallarna 
 Långörarna 
 Lappskatagrundet 
 Lavholmen 
 Lellrevet 
 Lill Björn 
 Lill Rönnskär 
 Lillhörun 
 Lill-Leskäret 
 Lill-Räbben 
 Lill-Renörarna 
 Lillrevet 
 Lill-Sandögrundet 
 Lill-Sandskäret 
 Lill-Svinören 
 Lönngrundet 
 Lövgrundet 
 Malen 
 Malkallen 
 Medgrundet 
 Medgrundsrevet 
 Mellerstön 
 Mitten Bondökallen 
 Mjoön 
 Mörgrundet 
 Mosesholmen 
 Näsgrundet 
 Nörd-Fårön 
 Nörd-Haraholmen 
 Nörd-Mörön 
 Norra revet 
 Nötögrundet 
 Nötön 
 Ol-Svensakallen 
 Ol-Svensastenarna 
 Orrskäret 
 Orrskärsgrundet 
 Orrskärsrevet 
 Örsgrönnan 
 Patta Peken 
 Peken 
 Pitholmen 
 Pultvikhällan 
 Rävagrundet 
 Renön 
 Renskärsrevet 
 Ringelrevet 
 Sandöklubben 
 Sandön 
 Sandskärsgrundet 
 Sandskärshörn 
 Skabbgrundet 
 Skottgrundet 
 Sladagrunden 
 Smågrunden 
 Söran 
 Sör-Fårön 
 Sör-Haraholmen 
 Spaningsören 
 Stenskäret 
 Stor Dödmannen 
 Storfjärdsgrunden 
 Storgrundet 
 Storhörun 
 Stor-Leskäret 
 Stor-Räbben 
 Stor-Renörarna 
 Storrevet 
 Stor-Sandskäret 
 Storstenen 
 Storstenrevet 
 Stor-Svinören 
 Tallskäret 
 Timmermannen 
 Trundön 
 Trutgrundet, Bergön 
 Trutgrundet, Bondön 
 Tvarun 
 Vargön 
 Västra revet 
 Vidvästern 
 Vorrskärsgrundet 
 Yttersten Bondökallen 
 Ytterstholmen 
 Yttre Degerstensgrundet 
 Yttre Mjoögrunden 
 Yttre Mörögrundet 
 Yxvättingen

See also
List of islands of Bothnian Bay

References

Pitea
Pitea
Pitea